The Ministry of Women, Children and Poverty Alleviation (MWCPA) is the government ministry of Fiji responsible for overseeing the well-being of women, children and the disabled in Fiji. The current Minister for Women, Children and Poverty Alleviation is Lynda Tabuya who was appointed to the position on 24 December 2022.

Responsibilities 
The Ministry provide services and programs that relates to the care and protection of women and children, promotion of gender equality and the reduction of poverty. The Ministry is also tasked in delivering care to the older and disabled people.

Ministers

See also 
Ministry of Education, Heritage and Arts
Ministry of Health and Medical Services
Ministry of Foreign Affairs and International Cooperation
Ministry of Commerce, Trade, Tourism and Transport

References 

Women's ministries
Government of Fiji
Government ministries of Fiji
Women in Fiji
Women's rights in Fiji